Ernest Born (1898−1992) was an architect, designer, and artist based in California. He and his wife Esther Baum Born (1902−1987) collaborated on diverse projects in the San Francisco Bay Area from 1936 on. She was also a notable architectural photographer.

Ernest was born in San Francisco, Esther in Palo Alto, and they married in 1926 after meeting at UC Berkeley’s architecture school.

Careers
Born studied architecture at the University of California, Berkeley, graduating from the school of Architecture in 1922. After graduation he traveled to Europe on a Guggenheim Fellowship, then returned to UC Berkeley earning a master's degree in 1923, with a thesis on the relation of painting to architecture.  He worked for prominent San Francisco architects such as John W. Reid, Jr., John Galen Howard, and George W. Kelham between 1923 and 1928.

The couple relocated to New York’s Greenwich Village in 1929. Esther took a job with Wallace Harrison, the architect overseeing the creation of Rockefeller Center. Ernest spent time as a draftsman at Shreve, Lamb & Harmon, designers of the Empire State Building. In 1931 he opened his own architectural practice, working on a wide variety of projects ranging from designing commercial spaces and exhibitions to architectural advertising. He served on the editorial staff of Architectural Record from 1933–34 and Architectural Forum from 1935-36.

He received his license to practice architecture in New York in 1931, and in California in 1937. He was later a Fellow of the American Institute of Architects (FAIA).

They returned to San Francisco in 1937 and went into business together, working residential, commercial and industrial projects, exhibitions, and photography. The Borns exhibited and promoted the then new Second Bay Tradition (1928−1942), and were part of the Third Bay Tradition (1945−1980s) of Modernist architecture and design.

His mural paintings for the Golden Gate International Exposition established his reputation as an artist. His drawings for a proposed United Nations Center, with William Wurster and Theodore Bernardi, were exhibited in San Francisco and New York museums. During the war years, Born worked with architect Gardner Dailey on special military projects in Brazil and in the U.S.

In 1949 they designed the 'Ernest and Esther Born House' for themselves, a Modernist residence located at 2020 Great Highway in the far west of the Sunset District. The house has since been modified with the addition of a tower.

In 1951, in collaboration with architect Henry H. Gutterson, Born designed North Beach Place, a public housing project at the cable car turntable on Taylor Street. It was demolished in 2001. The Borns’ 1958 vision for "Embarcadero City" for the San Francisco Port Authority, a master plan for the waterfront from the Ferry Building to Aquatic Park that would have replaced most existing structures with new buildings and piers with landfill, was never built.

In the 1970s Born designed signage for the Bay Area Rapid Transit (BART) system. Born collaborated in the design of the Balboa Park Station and Glen Park Station, with Corlett & Spackman. The Glen Park Station was Born's last architectural design project.

The Borns closed their design studio in 1973, later moved to San Diego where they lived in their retirement.

Born was an accomplished artist, type designer, and illustrator as well, and focused on these in his later years. He spent a decade collaborating with author Walter Horn to produce the 1979 Plan of St. Gall. Its illustrations are by Born.

Ernest Born died in 1992, at the age of 94.

See also
Esther Baum Born
Charles and Ray Eames — contemporary couple collaborating in Southern California.

References

External links 
 Youtube: video about Architects and Artists: The Work of Ernest and Esther Born
 UC Berkeley's Environmental Design Archives: Ernest Born Collection
 Online Archive of California: Inventory of the Ernest and Esther Born Collection, 1924-1985
 Finding Aid for Ernest Born architectural drawings ca. 1944- ca. 1981, Getty Research Institute, Los Angeles, Accession No. 920089
 Ernest Born lithographs, 1930-1931. Held by the Department of Drawings & Archives, Avery Architectural & Fine Arts Library, Columbia University.

American designers
American illustrators
Modernist architects
1898 births
1992 deaths
Architects from San Francisco
Fellows of the American Institute of Architects
UC Berkeley College of Environmental Design alumni
Architecture in the San Francisco Bay Area
20th-century American architects